Phylloxylon perrieri is a species of legume in the family Fabaceae. It is found only in Madagascar, and some Eastern parts of Jamaica.

References

Indigofereae
Endemic flora of Madagascar
Endangered plants
Taxonomy articles created by Polbot
Plants described in 1903